Grimmeodendron is a plant genus of the family Euphorbiaceae first described as a genus in 1908. It is native to the West Indies.

Species
 Grimmeodendron eglandulosum (A.Rich.) Urb. - Bahamas, Cuba, Hispaniola (Dominican Republic, Haiti)
 Grimmeodendron jamaicense Urb. - Jamaica

References

Euphorbiaceae genera
Flora of the Caribbean
Hippomaneae